This is a list of all personnel changes for the 1951 NBA off-season and 1951–52 NBA season.

Events

July 14, 1951
 The Syracuse Nationals traded Alex Hannum and Fred Scolari to the Baltimore Bullets for Red Rocha.

September 25, 1951
 The Minneapolis Lakers sold Kevin O'Shea to the Milwaukee Hawks.

October 10, 1951
The Fort Wayne Pistons sold Howie Schultz to the Minneapolis Lakers. Schultz was traded to Tri-Cities on May 31, 1951 but evidently he was returned.

October 17, 1951
 The Boston Celtics sold Frank Kudelka to the Baltimore Bullets. Report says Boston also gave up a 1st round draft pick for Bob Brannum but he was already sold to them on September 23, 1950.

November ?, 1951
 The Fort Wayne Pistons released Don Otten.

November 5, 1951
 The Baltimore Bullets sold Walt Budko to the Philadelphia Warriors.

November 23, 1951
 The Milwaukee Hawks signed Don Otten as a free agent.

November 29, 1951
 The Baltimore Bullets sold Don Rehfeldt to the Milwaukee Hawks.

December 26, 1951
 The Baltimore Bullets sold Red Owens to the Milwaukee Hawks.

January ?, 1952
 The Milwaukee Hawks signed Dillard Crocker as a free agent.

January 18, 1952
 The Baltimore Bullets sold Alex Hannum to the Rochester Royals.

January 26, 1952
 The Baltimore Bullets sold Pep Saul to the Minneapolis Lakers.

February 3, 1952
 The Milwaukee Hawks sold Kevin O'Shea to the Baltimore Bullets.

February 11, 1952
 The Fort Wayne Pistons traded Art Burris and cash to the Milwaukee Hawks for Dike Eddleman.

Notes
 Number of years played in the NBA prior to the draft
 Career with the franchise that drafted the player
 Never played a game for the franchise

External links
NBA Transactions at NBA.com
1951-52 NBA Transactions| Basketball-Reference.com

References

Transactions
1951-52